Yan "Yanni" Yrastorza Yuzon is a Filipino musician best known as the former guitarist of the band Pupil. He is currently the lead vocalist and guitarist for the band, Archipelago.

Early life
Born on March 7, 1978, Lead guitarist Yan Yrastorza Yuzon is the older brother of Sponge Cola guitarist and frontman, Yael Yuzon. The Yuzons are of Filipino and Basque descent. He is the older child of Johnny Yuzon (father) and Elsa Yuzon (mother) with middle brother Yael and younger sister Ysabel. He also taught theater direction at the Ateneo de Manila University. His famous works include a pop-culture adaptation of Bertolt Brecht’s "Three Penny Opera", "Linya", "Santuario" and a few more.

Being a very busy man, Yani is also a writer for ABS-CBN’s TV show "Goin' Bulilit". He also played the short role of Liam in ABS-CBN’s "Kay Tagal Kang Hinintay". His acting performances also include the role of Romeo in the Metropolitan Theater Guild's production of Romeo and Juliet (which was used in Sponge Cola's "Gemini" music video), alongside Ina Feleo, daughter of Filipino actor, Johnny Delgado, with the role of Juliet. Yan has previously appeared in local renditions of other Shakespearean plays like "Merchant of Venice" and "Macbeth". He also starred in an indie film titled "Three Boys" for Cinemanila. The film is about a band which is composed of Marc Abaya (vocals and guitars), Ping Medina (bass) and Yani Yuzon (drums). It was directed by Ming Kai Leung and produced by Marie Jamora.

Yani also used to front for the indie neo-glam band called Cat Siamese.[8] Yan uses a Carvin classic white guitar, Fender Stratocaster and Epiphone Les Paul. Yan Yuzon also launched his new band called Archipelago. Its members are Wendell Garcia on drums, Chad Rialp (of Sound and Liquid Jane) on bass, Pat Tirano (of Toi and Monkeyspank, co-produced Beautiful Machines and also co-produced Sponge Cola's Transit and self-titled third album with Yani Yuzon) on lead guitars and Yani Yuzon himself on frontman duties.

He was also featured in an instrumental compilation called "Mga Gitarista" (The Guitarists), wherein it features various instrumental songs from Filipino guitarists from different OPM bands such as Barbie Almalbis, Francis Reyes, Mong Alcaraz and Mike Elgar. His song "Mount Ordeals" was inspired by Final Fantasy Series.

Instruments & Equipment
Fender Stratocaster
Fender Telecaster
Gibson Les Paul
Epiphone Les Paul
Epiphone G-400
PRS SE Standard
Carvin guitars
Boss DR-55
Boss DR-3
Boss DR-5
Marshall amplifiers
Vox Amplifiers
Guitars

Filmography

TV Show
Goin' Bulilit - TV writer (2005–present)

Discography

With Pupil
Albums
Beautiful Machines (2005)
Wildlife (2007)
Limiters Of The Indefinite Pool (2011)

With Archipelago
Albums
Travel Advisory (2009)

Singles

With Pupil
Nasaan ka?
Dianetic
Nakakabaliw
Gamu-Gamo
Set Me Apart
Dulo ng Dila
Sala
Monobloc
Disconnection Notice
Teacher's Pet
Different Worlds

With Archipelago
MRI
May 1
Black Box

References

1978 births
Living people
21st-century Filipino male singers
Ateneo de Manila University alumni
Filipino guitarists